Reginald Campbell Thompson (21 August 1876 – 23 May 1941) was a British archaeologist, assyriologist, and cuneiformist. He excavated at Nineveh, Ur, Nebo and Carchemish among many other sites.

Biography
Thompson was born in Kensington, and educated at Colet Court, St Paul's School and Caius College, Cambridge, where he read oriental (Hebrew and Aramaic) languages.

In 1904 he found the remains of the temple of Nabu in Nineveh, which were destroyed in 2016 by the Islamic State of Iraq and the Levant.

In 1918 Mesopotamia fell into British hands, and the trustees of the British Museum applied to have an archaeologist attached to the army in the field to protect antiquities from injury. As a captain in the Intelligence Service serving in the region and a former assistant in the British Museum, R. C. Thompson was commissioned to start the work. After a short investigation of Ur, he dug at Shahrain and the mounds at Tell al-Lahm.

After the First World War he held a fellowship at Merton College, Oxford.

The writer Agatha Christie was invited by Thompson, along with her husband the archaeologist Max Mallowan, to the excavation site at Nineveh in 1931. She dedicated her story Lord Edgware Dies to "Dr and Mrs Campbell Thompson".  In return he dedicated his melodrama in blank verse Digger's Fancy to "Agatha and Max Mallowan".

He died in 1941 aged 64 while serving in the Home Guard River Patrol on the River Thames.

Bibliography
 A Century of Exploration at Nineveh. London, Luzac, 1900. Joint author: Richard Wyatt Hutchinson.
 The Devils and Evil Spirits of Babylonia, 2 vols. London, Luzac, 1903–1904.
 Late Babylonian Letters: Transliterations and Translations of a Series of Letters Written in Babylonian Cuneiform, Chiefly during the Reigns of Nabonidus, Cyrus, Cambyses, and Darius. London, Luzac, 1906.
 Semitic Magic: its Origins and Development. London, 1908.
 Archaeologia, Vol LXX (1921)
 The epic of Gilgamish, text, transliteration and notes. 1930.

Fiction
 A song of Araby (1921 as John Guisborough)
 A Mirage of Sheba (1923 as John Guisborough)
 Digger's Fancy

References

Sources
  British Museum collections
 Harry Reginald Holland Hall, A season's work at Ur, Al-'Ubaid, Abu Shahrain (Eridu) and Elsewhere, Being an Unofficial Account of the British Museum Archaeological Mission to Babylonia, 1919, Methuen, 1930.

External links
 British Museum biography
 Short biography by K. Kris Hirst
 British Academy Obituary

1876 births
1941 deaths
British archaeologists
English Assyriologists
Archaeologists of the Near East
20th-century British writers
20th-century archaeologists
Fellows of Merton College, Oxford